The Battle of Al-Qa'im (code-named Operation Matador) was a military offensive conducted by the United States Marine Corps, against insurgent positions in Iraq's northwestern Anbar province, which ran from 8 May 2005 to 19 May 2005. It was focused on eliminating insurgents and foreign fighters in a region known as a smuggling route and a sanctuary for foreign fighters.

Details
In mid-May 2005, Task Force 3/2 and elements of Task Force 3/25 (3rd Battalion/2nd Marines, 3rd Battalion/25th Marines, 4th Assault Amphibian Bn, 2nd Light Armored Reconnaissance Bn,B Co 4th Combat Engineer Bn, 2nd Platoon A Co 1st Tank Bn, and a detachment of H-1's from HMLA 269 ) supported by the 163rd Ordnance, conducted a sweep of an insurgent-held area near the Syrian border. 814th Engineer Company (MRB) led the initial offensive; breaching the river obstacle with a floating bridge while conducting concurrent rafting. It lasted eleven days, during which the U.S. troops killed more than 125 suspected insurgents and captured 39 others. The Marines captured and destroyed many weapon caches and suffered 9 killed in action and 40 wounded in action. Notable among these casualties was a squad from 1st Platoon, Lima Company 3rd Battalion, 25th Marines which had all of its members killed or wounded, mostly while embarked in an AAV that was struck by an IED.

Many of the insurgents encountered were not wearing uniforms, and in some cases were wearing protective vests. Furthermore, coalition officials noted that the training, tactics and organization displayed by the insurgents battled in the Syrian desert exceeded that which had been seen in other engagements further east, with only the exception of the former members of the Fedayeen (that comprised a large portion of insurgents fought by the Coalition in Operation Vigilant Resolve.) Thus it is plausible to believe that the Fedayeen made a large portion of the insurgents fought in Matador.

Additionally, the Marines in Matador did not have sufficient numbers to set up a permanent garrison in Al-Qa'im and the other insurgent held towns and withdrew as a result. Consequently, as soon as they left guerilla fighters were back in the towns and reestablished control over the town. Insurgents' continued presence in the Syrian desert meant that the Syrian border would remain a viable route for smuggling military equipment used by the insurgency. The engagement could loosely be described as a running battle, with the heaviest fighting taking place in urban environments located in Ubaydi, Arabi, and Al-Qa'im, all are cities in the insurgent dominated Al Anbar Governorate. It was followed by Operation Squeeze Play.

See also

2005 in Iraq
Post-invasion Iraq, 2003–present
Iraqi insurgency
Al Anbar Governorate
Syrian Desert

Notes

*Ellen Knickmeyer is the Baghdad bureau chief for the Washington Post and an embedded reporter in Iraq.

References

External links
Knarr, William. Al-Sahawa: An Awakening in Al Qaim

Battles of the Iraq War involving the United States
Battles of the Iraq War in 2005
Urban warfare
United States Marine Corps in the Iraq War
May 2005 events in Iraq